The 2022 FIBA U16 European Championship Division B was the 17th edition of the Division B of the European basketball championship for national under-16 teams. It was played from 11 to 20 August 2022 in Sofia, Bulgaria. Germany men's national under-16 basketball team won the tournament.

Participating teams 

  (16th place, 2019 FIBA U16 European Championship Division A)

  (15th place, 2019 FIBA U16 European Championship Division A)

  (14th place, 2019 FIBA U16 European Championship Division A)

  (Winners, 2019 FIBA U16 European Championship Division C)

First round
The draw of the first round was held on 15 February 2022 in Freising, Germany.

In the first round, the teams were drawn into four groups. The first two teams from each group advance to the quarterfinals; the third and fourth teams advance to the 9th–16th place playoffs; the other teams will play in the 17th–22nd place classification groups.

Group A

Group B

Group C

Group D

17th–22nd place classification

Group E

Group F

21st place match

19st place match

17st place match

9th–16th place playoffs

9th–16th place quarterfinals

13th–16th place semifinals

9th–12th place semifinals

15th place match

13th place match

11th place match

9th place match

Championship playoffs

Quarterfinals

5th–8th place semifinals

Semifinals

7th place match

5th place match

3rd place match

Final

Final standings

References

FIBA U16 European Championship Division B
2022–23 in European basketball
International youth basketball competitions hosted by Bulgaria
FIBA U16
August 2022 sports events in Bulgaria
Sports competitions in Sofia